Buggy is a surname. Notable people with the surname include:

Eileen Buggy, Irish make-up artist and hairstylist
Hugh Buggy (1896–1974), Australian journalist
Ned Buggy (born 1948), Irish hurler
Niall Buggy (born 1948), Irish actor
Paddy Buggy (1929–2013), Irish hurler
Regina Buggy (born 1959), American field hockey player